is an international hotel chain with locations mainly in Japan.  The original Hotel Okura opened in Tokyo in 1962. The Okura Hotels & Resorts worldwide chain includes Okura Hotels in, among other places, Amsterdam, Shanghai, Honolulu, Macau, Bangkok and Taipei. Okura Hotels also owns the Hotel JAL City and Hotel Nikko chains.

History 
Hotel Okura Co. Ltd. was founded in 1958 as Taisei Kanko Co. Ltd, serving as the company owning and later running the newly created Hotel Okura Tokyo in 1962. The hotel and company was founded by Kishichiro Okura, who envisioned Hotel Okura becoming a luxury hotel pioneering contemporary Japanese design. Designed by architect Yoshiro Taniguchi, the hotel's originality received worldwide admiration and numerous media and popular culture coverage.

Following the success of the initial hotel, Okura expanded with a restaurant bearing the hotel's namesake in Nagoya in 1966 before expanding the company westward with the opening of Hotel Okura Amsterdam in 1971. The Hotel Okura was turned into an officially recognised hotel chain in 1978. In 1979, Hotel Shilla opened in Seoul as a partner hotel of Okura Hotels. 

Over the next decades, the group continued to expand domestically in Japan with the opening of properties in Nagano, Kobe, Hamamatsu, Kyoto, and Fukuoka. Taisei Kanko Co. Ltd. was replaced by Hotel Okura Co. Ltd. in 1987. The company entered the Chinese market with the opening of Garden Hotel in Shanghai in 1990.

A marketing alliance was established in 2006 with Banyan Tree Hotels and Resorts. The company entered a further business alliance in 2008 with Rihga Royal Hotels Co. Ltd., sharing a joint venture in sales and marketing of accommodation business. 

In 2010, Hotel Okura Co. Ltd. acquired JAL Hotels from Japan Airlines, in turn taking over the Hotel Nikko and Hotel JAL City brands under its wing. The company's expansion continued in 2012, with the unveiling of The Okura Prestige, a subsidiary brand operating luxury hotels in foreign markets; the brand debuted with properties in Taipei and Bangkok. 

In 2015, the historic main building of the Tokyo Hotel Okura was controversially demolished, garnering significant criticism from historians and designers. The demolition received considerable media attention, including coverage of designer Tomas Maier's unsuccessful movement to save the building. The low-rise hotel was subsequently replaced with a skyscraper, which reopened as The Okura Tokyo in 2019.

Hotels 
As of July 2021, Hotel Okura operates 23 hotels in Asia, Europe, and North America, with 7 hotels in the pipeline.

Japan

 Hotel Okura, Chiba-shi, Chiba
 Okura Akademia Hotel, Kisarazu, Chiba
 Hotel Okura, Fukuoka, Kyushu
 Hotel Okura JR Huis Ten Bosch, Nagasaki, Kyushu
 Shiroyama Hotel, Kagoshima, Kyushu
 Hotel Okura, Sapporo, Hokkaido
 Hotel Okura, Kobe, Hyogo
 Kyoto Hotel Okura, Kyoto
 Hotel Kajima no Mori, Kitasaku, Nagano
 Hotel Okura, Niigata-shi, Niigata
 Okura Act City Hotel, Hamamatsu, Shizuoka
 Forest Inn Showakan, Tokyo
 Hotel East 21, Tokyo
 Hotel Okura Tokyo Bay, Tokyo
 The Okura, Tokyo

The Okura Prestige

 The Okura Prestige, Bangkok
 The Okura Prestige, Taipei

Shanghai

 Okura Garden Hotel, Shanghai

Macau

 Hotel Okura, Macau

Amsterdam

 Hotel Okura, Amsterdam, The Netherlands

Turkey

 Okura Spa & Resort, Cappadocia, Turkey

Hawaii

 The Kahala Hotel & Resort, Honolulu, Hawaii

Under Development
 The Okura Prestige, Phnom Penh, Cambodia (opening 2024)
 The Okura Prestige, Yangon, Myanmar (opening 2023)
 Hotel Okura, Manila, Philippines (opening 2023)
 Hotel Okura Bayshore, Manila, Philippines (opening 2024)
 The Okura Prestige, Taichung, Taiwan (opening 2023)
 The Okura Prestige Saigon, Ho Chi Minh City, Vietnam (opening 2023)

References

External links

 Okura Hotels & Resorts Official website

Hospitality companies of Japan
Hospitality companies
Hotel chains in Japan
Japanese brands
Hotels established in 1958
1958 establishments in Japan